Horace Mann School (also known as Horace Mann or HM) is a private, independent college-preparatory school in the Bronx, founded in 1887. Horace Mann is a member of the Ivy Preparatory School League, educating students from the New York metropolitan area from nursery school to the twelfth grade. The Upper, Middle, and Lower Divisions are located in Riverdale, a neighborhood of the Bronx, while the Nursery School is located in Manhattan. The John Dorr Nature Laboratory, a  campus in Washington Depot, Connecticut, serves as the school's outdoor and community education center. Tuition for the 2021–22 school year from pre-kindergarten through grade twelve is $57,200 per annum, not including some additional fees, one of which exceeds $1,000. The 2020 Niche survey ranked HM as the 3rd best K–12 private school in the country and the 12th best private high school in the country.

History

The school was founded in 1887 by Nicholas Murray Butler as a co-educational experimental and developmental unit of Teachers College at Columbia University. Its first location was 9 University Place in Manhattan's Greenwich Village. The school moved in 1901 to 120th Street in Morningside Heights. Horace Mann became independent of the Columbia University and Teachers College in 1940.

The school split into separate all-male and all-female schools and in 1914, the Boys' School moved to 246th Street in Riverdale, Bronx, and during the 1940s it severed formal ties with Columbia University and became Horace Mann School. The Horace Mann School for Girls remained at Teachers College, and then merged with the Lincoln School in 1940, and finally closed in 1946.

The New York School for Nursery Years (founded in 1954 on 90th Street in Manhattan) became the Horace Mann School for Nursery Years in 1968, and was co-ed. In 1972, Horace Mann merged with the Barnard School for Boys, next door in Riverdale, to form the Horace Mann-Barnard Lower School for kindergarten through grade six, located on the former Barnard School campus. At that point, only the lower school was mixed. In 1975, the Horace Mann School returned to its roots as a co-educational learning environment and began admitting girls to the Upper School. The Class of 1976 is Horace Mann School's last all-male class. In 1999, the sixth grade moved from the Horace Mann-Barnard campus to the main 246th Street campus and formed a distinct Middle Division along with the seventh and eighth grades.

The Horace Mann School was named after Horace Mann who was a lawyer who served in the Massachusetts State Legislature. He also was the first Secretary of the Massachusetts Board of Education (in the years between 1837 and 1848), a Member of the United States House of Representatives, and the first President of Antioch College. He used each of his positions to proclaim that every person, regardless of their background, should receive a public education based on the principles and practices of a free society. Horace Mann played a leading role in establishing the elementary school system in the United States.

Institution

The school is a private "nonprofit organization under the Education Law of New York State and holds a charter from the New York State Board of Regents [and is] a 501(c) 3 [tax-exempt] organization authorized by the Internal Revenue Service".

Divisions

There are four divisions of Horace Mann, all co-educational: a Nursery Division (three-year-olds through kindergarten) located on 90th Street in Manhattan, a Lower Division (kindergarten through fifth grades) on the Horace Mann campus on Tibbett Avenue in Riverdale, a Middle Division (sixth through eighth grades) on the 246th Street campus in Riverdale, and an Upper Division (ninth through twelfth grades) also on the 246th Street campus. The Dorr facility was recently renovated and is currently LEED-certified by the U.S. Green Building Council.

Current tuition for students in the Lower Division through the Upper Division is $57,200 a year. Financial aid at the school is solely based on need. For the 2021–22 academic year, 15% of the students received more than $12 million in aid.

Academics
HM offers twenty-six Honors courses and seven foreign languages.

Students in the Upper Division are required to study English, United States history, biology, chemistry, or physics or both, geometry, algebra, and trigonometry, and also meet various requirements in the arts, computer science, health and counseling, and physical education. Students must go beyond these basic requirements in at least some, if not all, subjects. They are also required to take at least through the levels-three courses of either Chinese, French, Japanese, Latin, or Spanish.

Starting in eleventh grade, students have more flexibility with their requirements and can choose from courses in biotechnology, calculus, economics, ethics, psychology, religion, political philosophy, United States legal history, and statistics, among other elective classes.

Independent Study and Senior Projects, where students create their own coursework and present their findings in weekly meetings, are also common. Additionally, some students have developed original research projects with faculty at such NYC universities as Columbia University, Weill Cornell Medical College, New York University, and Rockefeller University.

University Admissions
From 2017 to 2019, the ten most popular universities for Horace Mann graduates were the University of Chicago (44 students), Cornell (43 students), the University of Pennsylvania (25), Brown (21), Harvard (20), Yale and Michigan (18), and NYU, Tulane, and Washington University in St. Louis (17).

Arts
The school's arts program includes courses in the performing and visual arts. At least 2 arts credits are required for graduation, with at least one half-credit course in performance/studio arts and one half-credit course in art history/appreciation. Horace Mann has numerous ensembles, which include the Orchestra, String Sinfonietta, Glee Club, Chamber Choir Jazz Combo, Steel Drum Ensemble, and Chamber and Symphonic Winds. Each ensemble performs at least three to four concerts per year, including past performances at Carnegie Hall, Symphony Space, and Alice Tully Hall of Lincoln Center, culminating in a trip abroad over the summer.

Non-academic requirements
All students are required to take a swim test and American Red Cross CPR certification in order to graduate.

Community service is required throughout the curriculum. 80 hours of service is required during high school, including at least 40 hours in ninth and tenth grades and 40 hours in eleventh and twelfth. In eighth grade, one out-of-school project or three in-school projects are necessary for graduation to the ninth grade; in sixth and seventh grades a homeroom project is done cooperatively. In the Lower and Nursery Divisions, there is an annual "Caring-in-Action" day dedicated to community service that students and their families can attend.

Admission

Admission is selective with decisions based on recent grades, an interview, and the candidate's score on either the ISEE or SSAT test. The largest point of entry is in sixth grade, with between 50 and 55 places available each year. In the ninth grade, 40 to 45 new students are traditionally enrolled.

Rankings
The 2017 Niche survey ranked HM the best private K-12 school in the United States. The 2020 Niche survey ranked HM as the 3rd best K–12 private school in the country and the 12th best private high school in the country.

Student life

Student publications

Horace Mann also has a significant number of student publications. Many of them have won national awards. Prominent publications include:

The Record, established in 1903, is the weekly, student-run newspaper. Throughout its history, it has won national journalism awards and has been staffed by students who went on to become distinguished journalists and authors, including Pulitzer Prize winners Anthony Lewis (class of 1944), Richard Kluger (class of 1952), Robert Caro (class of 1953) and David Leonhardt (class of 1990). In 1954, the school made national headlines for translating a copy of The Record into Russian and distributing it in the USSR. The purpose of the exercise was to show Russian schoolchildren what life in America was like. The staff purposely kept in an article about the Horace Mann soccer team's losing one of its games to demonstrate the operation of an independent free press. The American Scholastic Press Association twice honored The Record as the "Best High School Weekly Newspaper" for 2001–2002 (Volume 99) and 2003–2004 (Volume 101). It was also named a National Pacemaker in 2004 (Volume 101) and in 2006 was a Columbia Scholastic Press Association Gold Medalist (Volume 103). The Record is published every Friday during the academic year.

The Horace Mann Review, now in its thirtieth volume, is an entirely student-run journal of opinion on current events, politics, public policy, and culture. Founded in 1991, The Review covers issues from unique, analytical, and otherwise unexamined perspectives. Students contribute editorial-style pieces on the contemporary political and social issues that are shaping our world. It prints roughly 8 times annually, with each issue highlighting a timely Features topic. The publication has paying subscribers throughout the nation and abroad and has been the recipient of numerous awards for excellence in journalism. In April 2001, the American Scholastic Press Association (ASPA) honored the Review with its award for Best Magazine. The Review's 2005–2006 volume was honored with a first-place finish in the American Scholastic Press Awards critique. In 2007, The Review was a finalist for the National Scholastic Press Association's Magazine Pacemaker of the Year award, the highest honor in high school journalism. The Review was again awarded the ASPA's Best Magazine Award in 2009 for its eighteenth volume and in 2012 for its twenty-first volume. Its twenty-second volume won the ASPA's First place with Special Merit award and the Outstanding Theme award (for the political magazine category) in 2013. Following a plagiarism issue, exposed in 2018 by Junior Editor Ari Moscona (who was then promoted to Deputy Editor), the Review's reputation was restored under the administration of Editor-in-Chief Pana Persianis in 2019, with the implementation of new thorough guidelines as well as a policy of openness. As a result, the magazine won the American Scholastic Press Association award for Best Current Events Magazine in the United States with Special Merit, maintaining top-level standards throughout the Review's 28th volume.

The Mannikin is the yearbook of the Horace Mann School. Traditional sections include Student Life, Underclassmen, Seniors (each graduate receives a half-page to design as they wish), Athletics, Faculty and Advertisements.

Other school publications include: Spectrum, the scientific research magazine, Folio 51, the gender issues magazine, Pixelated, the video-game, television and media publication, For The Win, the sports publication, The Business Mann, the business and finance publication, Manuscript and Word, the creative poetry and prose publications respectively, Insight, the photography publication, Edible, the culinary publication, Images, an art magazine, the Thespian, a theatre publication, Cinemann, the current movie review magazine, Lola's Kitchen, a one-page periodical published by the Gay Straight Alliance, InsideOut, a health publication, Framework, an American History Publication, and FAD Magazine, a fashion magazine. Additionally, a literary-arts magazine called Muse, featuring the work of Middle School students, is published each year.

Athletics

Interscholastic leagues
Horace Mann School is a part of the Ivy Preparatory School League, a division of the greater New York State Association of Independent Schools (NYSAIS), which comprises all the private schools in New York State.
Fieldston, Riverdale, and Horace Mann together are known as the "Hill Schools", as all three are located within two miles (3 km) of each other in the Riverdale-Fieldston section of the Bronx, on a hill above Van Cortlandt Park. The three also share a great interscholastic sports rivalry; Horace Mann's annual charity basketball game, the Buzzell Game, is almost always versus Riverdale, and sometimes Fieldston.

Football
The Horace Mann Varsity Football Team plays in the Hudson Valley Football League.  In 2013 Horace Mann won the Hudson Valley Football League Championship with a season record of 6–2.  In 2014 Horace Mann again won the Hudson Valley Football League with a season record of 9-0.  The 2014 Horace Mann Football Team had an undefeated season for the first time since 1957.  In 2015 Horace Mann won the Hudson Valley Football League (for the third time in a row) with a season record of 6–2.

Wrestling
The Horace Mann Varsity Wrestling Team participates in both the Ivy Preparatory League as well as NYSAIS. In 2019, Horace Mann made history by placing first in the NYSAIS Championships, with four individual champions and a team record of 15-0. In 2020, Horace Mann placed first at the Ivy Preparatory Championships and the NYSAIS Championships. After a season lost to the Covid-19 pandemic, Horace Mann came back in the 2022 with an Ivy League Championship and a dual meet record of 19-1.

Sports teams

 V = Varsity, JV = Junior Varsity, MD = Middle Division, VB = Varsity B

Sexual abuse scandal

Initial reports 
On June 6, 2012, The New York Times Magazine published an article by a former student, alleging multiple instances of sexual abuse of students by teachers at the school. The incidents occurred during the 1970s to the 1990s. The article also addressed how school administrators over time dealt with the incidents, both within the school community and, in the case of one teacher, in a post-employment reference. The affected students were identified by partial name or letter and many administrators and board members had limited or no comment. New York State statute of limitations in most or all of the incidents addressed ran out when the former students turned 23. Several of the central figures were dead, at least two by suicide—one of the accused, and one of the students. Another of the accused teachers, Johannes Somary, a music teacher, died in 2011. On June 23, 2012, The New York Times reported that Tek Young Lin, Horace Mann's former chaplain who also served as an English teacher and track coach, admitted that he had had sexual relations with his students.

Hilltop Cares Foundation 
As a result of the sexual abuse and resulting controversy, the Hilltop Cares Foundation was formed in the summer of 2012 by members of the Horace Mann community, including alumni Marjorie Kaufman and Joe Rose, to help victims from the school and to promote healing. The charitable organization helps alumni with their therapy costs and studies related issues in the broader community. It is a nonprofit and is independent of the school’s administration and board of trustees. The Chair for Hilltop Cares, Kaufman, explained that Hilltop Cares plans to "provide support for alumni who suffered abuse at the school years ago, to support their therapy, as well as to bring about some healing to the whole Horace Mann community."

Negotiations 
In March 2013, the school was reportedly in negotiation with more than thirty students for compensation related to the abuse claims. Eighteen different faculty members had been accused, and events spanning the four decades prior to 2000 identified. In March 2013, The New Yorker published an article discussing sexual abuse allegations against a former Horace Mann English teacher, Robert Berman. In April, The New York Times reported the school had reached a settlement with about 27 of the 37 students identified as having been abused. The school formally apologized on May 24 to the community for the events that had occurred and published the actions the school has taken and protocols which were put in place to protect current and future students.

Notable alumni

See also
 Education in New York City

References

External links

 

Educational institutions established in 1887
Ivy Preparatory School League
Preparatory schools in New York City
Private elementary schools in the Bronx
Private high schools in the Bronx
Private middle schools in the Bronx
Private K-12 schools in New York City
Riverdale, Bronx
School sexual abuse scandals
1887 establishments in New York (state)